Naraka: Bladepoint (Chinese: 永劫无间, pinyin: yǒngjiéwújiān) is an action-adventure battle royale game developed by 24 Entertainment and published by NetEase Games Montreal. It is a battle royale game where up to 60 players fight each other to be the last one standing. The game incorporates martial arts-inspired melee combat and features a rock-paper-scissors combat system. There are vast arsenals of melee and ranged weapons to choose from, as well as a grappling hook that can be used for both combat and traversal. In addition, each hero has unique skills and talents, allowing for customization to suit your play style. The game was released for Windows in August 2021 and was ported to Xbox Series X/S on June 23, 2022. Versions for Xbox One and PlayStation 5 are also in development. Naraka: Bladepoint has sold more than 6 million copies globally since its launch in August 2021.

Gameplay
Naraka: Bladepoint sets its premise on "Morus Island" where heroes gather for battle. Players can queue up for either solo games or in trios and can choose from more than nine different characters, while each of those has two skills (F skill and Ultimate).

In solo mode, players play alone, while in trio mode, players start the game with two other members in the same team to compete in the game. After matching with enough players (maximum 60 players in one round), players choose characters with different skill set, called Heroes, to play. Finishing selecting heroes, players choose one spawn location on the map, and other teammates can choose to follow or spawn wherever they like. Once players are shown on the map, the team can search for weapons grapples, health or armors to equip them up. In the meantime, the team will have to pay attention to enemy squads showing up to avoid ambush.

While players keep searching and fighting on the map, the safe zone in Naraka: Bladepoint will get smaller with a random center. However, players have time to prepare for the spreading of shadow corruption. There are multiple events in one round of the game, such as eliminating the targeted enemy, praying in front of a Buddhism, etc.  

When knocked down, players are able to get on their feet again if teammates come to rescue them in a short period of time; otherwise, they will die after being cairns. However, if it is before the first round of shadow corruption spreading, players can still get back on the map and fight again by using soul altars after their death.

In each round, a squad of heroes will win the game as the top one team.

Seasons

Characters 
Naraka: Bladepoint currently has 14 playable characters, the newest being Feria Shen, added on December 22nd, 2022.

Yoto Hime originates from another game made by NetEase Games, Onmyoji Arena.

Development 
Naraka: Bladepoint is a battle royale which was partly influenced by Devil May Cry and Sekiro. The game's producer had also included elements from the  game franchise, which he had previously worked on, while Thunder Fire UX has helped with UX design and user research. Naraka: Bladepoint, along with many other titles, was officially announced during the Game Awards 2019 ceremony on December 12, 2019. From November 3 to 9, 2020, Naraka: Bladepoint had its steam server test in North America region to test its gameplay and performance. It was then announced that Naraka: Bladepoint was in development for consoles, with the game being shown running on a PlayStation 5 The mobile version is under development to provide the melee-focused combat gaming experience for mobile players globally.

Release
Naraka: Bladepoint  launched worldwide on August 11, 2021 with more than 10 language versions.

The game was released on Xbox Series X/S on June 23, 2022, with the game also being available to Xbox Game Pass subscribers at no additional charge. In September 2021, ThunderFire Universe X Studio was officially established, shifting its focus to overseas markets and console development. The first job was to accept the commission from NetEase Thunderfire Business Division and 24 Entertainment to develop the console version of the game. An Xbox One version of Naraka: Bladepoint was released on December 22, 2022 and it's ported by ThunderFire Universe X Studio. Alongside the release date, a crossover event with Nier series was announced.

Esports 
The first official Naraka: Bladepoint tournament in Southeast Asia, Celestra Cup, started on September 9, 2021, ended season finale on December 12 and witnessed the first winner of SEA Naraka tournament.

Reception 

Naraka: Bladepoint received "mixed or average" reviews according to review aggregator Metacritic. The game was nominated as Best Multiplayer Game 2021 of Golden Joystick Awards on October 19, 2021, which is the one of the oldest game awards globally.

Player count and revenue 
The game hit over 120,000 concurrent players in its April Steam test. By November 9, 2021, the game has reached more than 6 million copies selling globally. It means that it had more than $250 million gross revenue by selling copies and in-game virtual collectibles.

External links
Official website

Notes

References

2021 video games
Battle royale games
Multiplayer video games
Open-world video games
Survival video games
Video games developed in China
Windows games
Windows-only games